The 2009 FIM Speedway World Championship Grand Prix of Denmark was the fourth race of the 2009 Speedway Grand Prix season. It took take place on 13 June 2009 in the Parken Stadium in Copenhagen, Denmark.

The Grand Prix was won by Australian Jason Crump who beat American Greg Hancock, Pole Tomasz Gollob and Danish wild card Niels Kristian Iversen in the final. It was Crump's second Grand Prix win of the 2009 season.

Riders 

The Speedway Grand Prix Commission nominated Niels Kristian Iversen as the wild card and Patrick Hougaard and Nicolai Klindt as the first and second track reserves. The riders' starting positions draw for Grand Prix meeting was made on 12 June at 13:00 CET.

Heat details

Heat after heat 
 (55.8) Sayfutdinov, Andersen, Gollob, Ułamek
 (55.7) Walasek, Crump, Harris, Lingren
 (55.8) Iversen, Jonsson, Hancock, Holta
 (55.4) Pedersen, Bjerre, Adams, Nicholls
 (54.5) Ułamek, Crump, Adams, Jonsson
 (55.0) Bjerre, Hancock, Andersen, Lindgren
 (54.8) Sayfutdinov, Iversen, Harris, Pedersen (Fx) Pedersen and Sayfutdinov crash. Pedersen is excluded.
 (55.7) Gollob, Holta, Walasek, Nicholls
 (55.1) Ułamek, Lindgren, Nicholls, Iversen Ulamek and Nicholls clash. Race restarted.
 (55.0) Crump, Holta, Pedersen, Andersen
 (55.0) Sayfutdinov, Jonsson, Pedersen, Andersen
 (55.7) Hancock, Adams, Gollob, Harris
 (55.6) Harris, Bjerre, Holta, Ułamek
 (55.9) Iversen, Walasek, Andersen, Adams
 (54.7) Crump, Sayfutdinov, Nicholls, Hancock
 (55.4) Pedersen, Jonsson, Gollob, Lindgren
 (56.2) Pedersen, Hancock, Ułamek, Walasek
 (56.0) Nicholls, Andersen, Jonsson, Harris
 (54.9) Sayfutdinov, Adams, Lindgren, Holta
 (55.4) Crump, Gollob, Iversen, Bjerre
 Semi-Finals:
 (57.5) Gollob, Iversen, Ułamek, Sayfutdinov (T) Sayfutdinov makes false start and is excluded.
 (56.3) Crump, Hancock, Bjerre, Pedersen (E3)
 The Final:
 (55.3) Crump, Hancock, Gollob, Iversen

The intermediate classification

See also 
 Speedway Grand Prix
 List of Speedway Grand Prix riders

References

External links 
 FIM-live.com 

Denmark
2009
2009 in Danish motorsport